The Abyss is a recording studio in Pärlby outside Ludvika, Sweden. It is owned and operated by record producer and musician Peter Tägtgren.

Recordings
The following list consists of releases recorded, produced or mixed by Peter Tägtgren at The Abyss studios (meaning Studio A run by Peter himself)

Recording studios in Sweden